KQBM (90.7 FM) is a radio station licensed to serve the community of San Andreas, California. The station is owned by Blue Mountain Coalition for Youth and Families and airs a variety format.

The station was assigned the KQBM call letters by the Federal Communications Commission on February 20, 2011.

References

External links
 Official Website
 

QBM (FM)
Radio stations established in 2014
2014 establishments in California
Variety radio stations in the United States
Community radio stations in the United States
Calaveras County, California